"So Here We Are" / "Positive Tension" is a double A-side single by English rock band Bloc Party from their 2005 debut album, Silent Alarm. It was released in the United Kingdom by Wichita Recordings and peaked at number five on the UK Singles Chart, their second-highest-charting single to date, behind 2007's "The Prayer". The song also reached number 31 in Ireland. The UK 7-inch vinyl release contains "The Marshals Are Dead" instead of "Positive Tension".

Track listings
UK CD single: "So Here We Are" / "Positive Tension" 
 "So Here We Are"
 "Positive Tension"
 "Helicopter" (Sheriff Whitey Mix)

UK 7-inch single: "So Here We Are" / "The Marshals Are Dead" 
 "So Here We Are"
 "The Marshals Are Dead"

UK DVD single: "So Here We Are" 
 "So Here We Are" (audio)
 "The Marshals Are Dead" (audio)
 "So Here We Are" (video)
 "Tulips" (video)

European maxi-CD single: "So Here We Are" / "Positive Tension" 
 "So Here We Are"
 "Positive Tension"
 "The Marshals Are Dead"
 "So Here We Are" (Four Tet Remix)
 "Always New Depths"

Charts

References

2005 singles
2005 songs
Bloc Party songs
Song recordings produced by Paul Epworth
Songs written by Gordon Moakes
Songs written by Kele Okereke
Songs written by Matt Tong
Songs written by Russell Lissack
V2 Records singles
Wichita Recordings singles
UK Independent Singles Chart number-one singles